Sir Ian Charles Rayner Byatt (born 11 March 1932) is a British economist who was the Director General of the economic regulator of the water industry in England and Wales, Ofwat, from its creation at the time of the privatization of the water industry in 1989 until 2000. During his tenure he was responsible for a substantial price reduction imposed on private water companies in 1999 that sent the share prices of these companies tumbling. He then joined the newly created economic consulting firm Frontier Economics. From 2005–11 he was the Chairman of the Water Industry Commission for Scotland, the economic regulator of the Scottish water industry. In 2012 he criticized the Thames Tideway Scheme as unnecessary and argued that private firms should not receive the massive subsidies they have requested to finance the scheme.

Prior to becoming the water regulator, Ian Byatt was Head of Public Sector Economic Unit (1972–78) and then Deputy Chief Economic Adviser (1978–89) at Her Majesty's Treasury under Margaret Thatcher. He graduated from Oxford University, obtaining a doctorate with a thesis entitled The British electrical industry, 1875-1914 and Harvard University.
He recently self-published a collection of articles on the regulation of water companies entitled A Regulator's Sign-off:Changing the Taps in Britain
He was knighted in the 2000 Birthday Honours.

Byatt is a member of the academic advisory council of the Global Warming Policy Foundation, a group which disputes the science behind global warming.

Personal life
He was married to novelist A.S. Byatt ( Drabble) between 1959 and 1969. He married Professor Deirdre Kelly on 12.12.1997

References

English economists
Harvard Graduate School of Arts and Sciences alumni
1935 births
Alumni of the University of Oxford
Knights Bachelor
Living people